Apostolepis borellii is a species of snake in the family Colubridae. It is found in Brazil and Bolivia.

References 

borellii
Reptiles described in 1904
Reptiles of Brazil
Reptiles of Bolivia
Taxa named by Mario Giacinto Peracca